The ancient Roman aqueduct of Paris (also known as the Aqueduct of Lutetia) supplied Roman Paris, then called Lutetia.

It was a major engineering and architectural achievement, bringing water from the south, 26 km distant under gravity with a constant gradual slope. It was mainly built underground with one middle section raised on great arches to cross the Bievre valley. The water it supplied was of better quality than that of the Seine.

History

It was probably built in the late 2nd century AD under Septimius Severus (r.193-211) to supply the thermal baths of Cluny built around the beginning of the 3rd century, other baths and public and private buildings. Around the mid-third century a series of invasions caused the inhabitants to desert the south bank and concentrate on the Île de la Cité, when the aqueduct began to lose much of its interest.

Route

The water was collected from the springs and the drainage of the plain located between Wissous, Rungis, Chilly-Mazarin and Morangis, in the department of Essonne. Small channels from this area flowed into a 15 m3 collection basin called the Carré des Eaux de Wissous. From here the main aqueduct started and collected springs along its route.

The aqueduct arrived in Paris at the Montsouris park, where several sections are preserved, then reached the Sainte-Geneviève hill by the rue Saint-Jacques and then into the ancient city, thermal baths, fountains and palaces.

In general, the water flowed in an opus caementicium channel of variable outside dimensions (typically 0.6 m high by 1.3 m wide) and buried at a depth of about 1 m, with a 45 cm wide inside channel sealed with opus signinum and covered with stone slabs. Its average slope was 0.56 m/km. It is estimated that its flow was 1,500 m3/day.

One of the most significant recent discoveries took place in Paris in 1996 during redevelopment of the sector where the former workshops of the Sceaux railway were located, between rue d'Alésia and avenue Reille, led to the discovery of an unknown section of the aqueduct, a part of which has been preserved in the Marie-Thérèse-Auffray garden.

The Arcueil bridge

In Arcueil and Cachan, it passed from the eastern to the western hillside of the Bièvre valley using an aqueduct bridge. All that remains today is a collapsed arch and a few piles embedded in a wall, in the property known since the Middle Ages as the Fief des Arcs. The arches of the bridge are the origin of its name, as well as that of the village itself. The Château des Arcs, built from 1548, encloses the remains of the aqueduct bridge. The bridge was about 300 m long, 18 m high and had a single level of arches.

The Medici aqueduct bridge is very close to that of the ancient aqueduct.

The collection basin

The remains were rediscovered in the  19th century. They were subsequently excavated at the beginning of the 20th century by the Commission du Vieux Paris (CVP).

The rectangular collecting basin joined a series of channels from the sources of the south, in particular those of Chilly and Morangis. The basin was later covered by metres of rubble despite its historical interest.

Gallery

References

Roman aqueducts in France
Roman Paris